
This table contains the final ranks and insignia of the Waffen-SS, which were in use from April 1942 to May 1945, in comparison to the Wehrmacht.

Table

 Remarks

See also
 Corps colours (Waffen-SS)
 Uniforms and insignia of the Schutzstaffel
 Ranks and Insignia of the German Army in World War II
 Comparative military ranks of World War II
 List of SS personnel
 Glossary of Nazi Germany
 SS-Degen

Notes

References
Citations

Bibliography

External links
 German WWII Army & SS Rank & Insignia

 
 
SS
Waffen-SS